Sir Joseph Nathaniel France, KCMG, CBE (16 September 1907 – 21 May 1997) was a Saint Kitts and Nevis politician and trade union leader.

Life and career
France served as a representative in the National Assembly and as Minister of Social Services under Chief Minister Paul Southwell. He was also the General Secretary for the St. Kitts and Nevis Trades and Labour Union.

In 1996, France became a Knight Commander of the Order of St Michael and St George. In 2004, France was posthumously granted the title of National Hero by the National Assembly and is honoured annually on National Heroes Day. The general hospital in St. Kitts was named in his honour.

References 
 

1907 births
1997 deaths
Recipients of the Order of the National Hero (Saint Kitts and Nevis)
Members of the National Assembly (Saint Kitts and Nevis)
Saint Kitts and Nevis Labour Party politicians
Government ministers of Saint Kitts and Nevis
People from Saint Kitts
National Heroes of Saint Kitts and Nevis